Tarik Tissoudali (born 2 April 1993) is a Moroccan professional footballer who plays as a winger for Gent, in the Belgian First Division. Born in the Netherlands, he represents the Morocco national team at international level, having made his debut in 2022. In February 2021, he moved from Beerschot to Gent.

International career
Tissoudali made his debut for the Morocco U23s in a friendly 1–0 win against the Cameroon U23s, in which he scored the game-winning goal. He was called up to represent the senior Morocco national team for the 2021 Africa Cup of Nations. He debuted with them in a 1–0 win over Ghana on 10 January 2022.

Career statistics

Club

International
Scores and results list Morocco's goal tally first, score column indicates score after each Tissoudali goal.

Honours
Gent
 Belgian Cup: 2021–22

Individual
 Belgian Lion Award: 2021, 2022
 Ebony Shoe: 2022
 Belgian First Division Team of the Year: 2021–22
 Jean-Claude Bouvy Trophy: 2021–22

References

External links 
 Voetbal International profile 
 

1993 births
Living people
Dutch people of Moroccan descent
Footballers from Amsterdam
Moroccan footballers
Dutch footballers
Association football wingers
Morocco international footballers
Morocco youth international footballers
2021 Africa Cup of Nations players
Sparta Nijkerk players
SC Telstar players
Le Havre AC players
SC Cambuur players
VVV-Venlo players
De Graafschap players
K Beerschot VA players
K.A.A. Gent players
Eredivisie players
Eerste Divisie players
Ligue 1 players
Belgian Pro League players
Challenger Pro League players
Moroccan expatriate footballers
Moroccan expatriate sportspeople in Belgium
Expatriate footballers in Belgium